Species of Delphinium include:

 Delphinium alabamicum: Alabama larkspur
 Delphinium alpestre: Colorado larkspur
 Delphinium altissimum
 Delphinium andersonii: Anderson's larkspur
 Delphinium andesicola: Chiricahua Mountain larkspur
 Delphinium antoninum: Tracy's larkspur
 Delphinium arthriscifolium
 Delphinium bakeri: Baker's delphinium
 Delphinium barbeyi: subalpine larkspur
 Delphinium basalticum: basalt larkspur
 Delphinium bicolor: little larkspur
 Delphinium brachycentrum: northern larkspur
 Delphinium brownii
 Delphinium brunonianum
 Delphinium bulleyanum
 Delphinium caeruleum
 Delphinium californicum: California larkspur
 Delphinium calthifolium: from Sichuan, China
 Delphinium cardinale: scarlet larkspur
 Delphinium carolinianum: Carolina larkspur
 Delphinium caseyi: Casey's larkspur
 Delphinium cashmerianum
 Delphinium chamissonis: Chamisso's larkspur
 Delphinium cheilanthum
 Delphinium consolida
 Delphinium corymbosum
 Delphinium decorum: coastal larkspur
 Delphinium delavayi
 Delphinium denudatum
 Delphinium depauperatum: slim larkspur
 Delphinium dictyocarpum
 Delphinium distichum: twospike larkspur
 Delphinium duhmbergii
 Delphinium elatum: candle larkspur
 Delphinium exaltatum : tall larkspur
 Delphinium fissum
 Delphinium formosum: showy larkspur
 Delphinium geraniifolium: Clark Valley larkspur
 Delphinium geyeri: Geyer's larkspur
 Delphinium glareosum: Olympic larkspur

 Delphinium glaucescens: smooth larkspur
 Delphinium glaucum: Sierra larkspur
 Delphinium gracilentum: pine forest larkspur
 Delphinium grandiflorum: Siberian larkspur
 Delphinium gypsophilum: Pinoche Creek larkspur
 Delphinium hansenii: Eldorado larkspur
 Delphinium hesperium: foothill larkspur
 Delphinium hutchinsoniae: Monterey larkspur
 Delphinium hybridum
 Delphinium inopinum: unexpected larkspur
 Delphinium iris
 Delphinium ithaburense
 Delphinium leroyi
 Delphinium leucophaeum
 Delphinium likiangense
 Delphinium linarioides
 Delphinium lineapetalum: thinpetal larkspur
 Delphinium luteum: yellow larkspur
 Delphinium maackianum
 Delphinium macrocentron
 Delphinium madrense: Sierra Madre larkspur
 Delphinium menziesii: Menzies' larkspur
 Delphinium multiplex : Kittitas larkspur
 Delphinium muscosum
 Delphinium nelsonii
 Delphinium newtonianum: Newton's larkspur
 Delphinium novomexicanum: White Mountain larkspur
 Delphinium nudicaule: red larkspur
 Delphinium nuttallianum: twolobe larkspur
 Delphinium nuttallii: upland larkspur
 Delphinium occidentale: subalpine larkspur
 Delphinium oreganum
 Delphinium oxysepalum
 Delphinium parishii: desert larkspur
 Delphinium parryi: San Bernardino larkspur
 Delphinium patens: zigzag larkspur
 Delphinium pavonaceum
 Delphinium peregrinum: violet larkspur
 Delphinium polycladon: mountain marsh larkspur
 Delphinium przewalskii

 Delphinium purpusii: Kern County larkspur
 Delphinium pylzowii
 Delphinium ramosum: mountain larkspur
 Delphinium recurvatum: Byron larkspur
 Delphinium robustum: Wahatoya Creek larkspur
 Delphinium roylei
 Delphinium sapellonis: Sapello Canyon larkspur
 Delphinium scaposum: tall mountain larkspur
 Delphinium scopulorum: Rocky Mountain larkspur
 Delphinium semibarbatum
 Delphinium speciosum
 Delphinium stachydeum: spiked larkspur
 Delphinium sutchuense
 Delphinium sutherlandii: Sutherland's larkspur
 Delphinium tatsienense
 Delphinium treleasei: glade larkspur
 Delphinium tricorne: dwarf larkspur
 Delphinium triste
 Delphinium trolliifolium: Columbian larkspur
 Delphinium uliginosum: swamp larkspur
 Delphinium umbraculorum: umbrella larkspur
 Delphinium variegatum: royal larkspur
 Delphinium verdunense
 Delphinium vestitum
 Delphinium villosum
 Delphinium virescens
 Delphinium viridescens: Wenatchee larkspur
 Delphinium viride
 Delphinium wootonii: Organ Mountain larkspur
 Delphinium xantholeucum: yellow-white larkspur
 Delphinium yunnanense
 Delphinium zalil: zalil

Reassigned:
 Delphinium staphisagria = Staphisagria staphisagria

References 

List
Delphinium